Abigail Garner (born 1975 in Minneapolis, Minnesota) is an American author and advocate for children with  LGBT parents.

Biography
Garner is the author of Families Like Mine, a compilation of interviews from more than 50 children of LGBT parents, and discusses a breadth of issues including AIDS, divorce and homophobia. She is the creator of a companion website to the book, FamiliesLikeMine.com, a resource for LGBT families. Her writing has appeared in a number of publications including a commentary in Newsweek.

Garner served on the board of the Minnesota/St. Paul chapter of PFLAG (Parents, Friends and Families of Lesbians and Gays). In addition, for six years she was on the board for the Twin Cities chapter of COLAGE.

Garner popularized the term "Queerspawn", a term children with gay parents call themselves, coined by Stefan Lynch, first director of COLAGE. She is a graduate of Wellesley College. Garner identifies as heterosexual, her father came out as gay when she was five years old.

Bibliography
Books
 

Book chapters
 Like Father, Like Daughter, in 

Articles

References

External links
 Families Like Mine
 2002 Interview on National Public Radio

1975 births
Living people
American family and parenting writers
American political writers
Writers from Minneapolis
Wellesley College alumni
American women non-fiction writers
21st-century American women